Beg (after the Himalayan war deity Beg-tse) is a genus of neoceratopsian dinosaur from the early Cretaceous period of Mongolia. The genus contains a single species, Beg tse, known from a partial skull and very fragmentary postcrania. Beg represents the most basal neoceratopsian currently known.

Discovery and naming 
The holotype, IGM 100/3652, was discovered in 2015 near the town of Tsogt-Ovoo in the Ömnögovi Province of Mongolia. Described from the Ulaanoosh Formation, the specimen is dated to 113 to 94 million years ago, at the boundary of the Lower and Upper Cretaceous.

Beg is named after Beg-tse, a Himalayan deity who is the god of war in Mongolian culture. The deity is often depicted with a rugose face and/or body, similar to the appearance of the preserved skull of the dinosaur.

Description 

It shows transitional features between basal ceratopsians and other neoceratopsians because it is phylogenetically intermediate between them. Other fossil material, though fragmentary, includes a rib, partial left scapula, partial right ischium, and many bone fragments that cannot be identified.

Paleoecology 
Beg is known from the Ulaanoosh Formation of southern Mongolia. Sauropods, turtles and dinosaur eggs assigned to Parafaveoloolithus sp. are also known from the formation.

See also
List of short species names

References 

Ceratopsians
Neoceratopsians
Albian life
Cenomanian life
Cretaceous dinosaurs of Asia
Cretaceous Mongolia
Fossils of Mongolia
Fossil taxa described in 2020